Spectacular! is a 2009 musical comedy-drama film that aired on Nickelodeon and YTV. It stars Canadian singer Nolan Gerard Funk, Australian  singer Tammin Sursok, Victoria Justice and Simon Curtis with Matthew Bennett, Andrea Lewis, Shannon Chan-Kent, Joel Ballard, and Avan Jogia. Filmed in Vancouver, British Columbia, Canada, it premiered February 16, 2009 on Nickelodeon, and YTV on May 8, 2009. The soundtrack was released on February 3, 2009, with a full webstream on MTV.com released the previous week.

Spectacular! attracted 3.7 million viewers during its premiere.

Plot
As the opening credits roll, a band called Flux, apparently with no singer, starts to play at a nightclub. Among the audience is a girl named Courtney Lane (Tammin Sursok). Interspersed with the scenes of the band playing, lead singer Nikko Alexander (Nolan Gerard Funk) calmly walks into the club through the back, barely making his cue for "Don't Tell Me". At the end of the song, he kicks over one of the amps, destroying it for effect. After the performance, the other members of Flux, upset by his carelessness, kick him out of the band; Nikko's girlfriend Amy (Britt Irvin), who is also in the band, dumps him. After the band members leave, Courtney frantically attempts to recruit Nikko into a show choir named "Spectacular!," of which she is leader. Though Nikko is skeptical and condescendingly rejects her offer, Courtney begs him to come to a carnival to see the choir perform and then make his decision.

The next day at the carnival, Nikko arrives in time to see the Spectacular! show choir perform "Eye of the Tiger". Afterward, the ever-anxious Courtney once again attempts to persuade Nikko, who is less than impressed by the group's performance and style, to join the show choir and help them win a national contest, even offering him half the group's earnings from the contest in exchange for his consent. Nikko declines to join the group, stating that he isn't interested in choir. Soon, another show choir named Ta-da performs "Things We Do for Love". The lead singers are Royce (Simon Curtis), who used to be the lead singer for Spectacular! but quit after breaking up with Courtney, and Tammi (Victoria Justice), Royce's new girlfriend who is a snobby and selfish girl. It is hinted she was a member of "Spectacular!" because of the number of times Courtney calls her a backstabber and that the letter I in her name stand for the "ice in her veins". Later on, Nikko meets with and performs for a famous music producer named Mr. Dickenson (Matthew Bennett), who informs him that he has a shot at getting a record deal if he can raise enough money for equipment for his demo, which has to be excellent. Nikko recalls Courtney's offer of half the earnings from the contest Spectacular! plans to perform in, and decides to join the choir in order to get the money to pay for his demo. When he approaches the choir Courtney remembers his mockery of their carnival performance and initially refuses to let him join, but acquiesces after Nikko demonstrates his talent by performing "Break My Heart" in front of the whole group, who are impressed by his vocals. When they are practicing, however, Nikko finds out that dancing for show choir is not as easy as it looks and cannot easily pick up the dance routines. Nikko, who lives with his older brother Stavros (Christopher Jacot), does not inform his brother that he has joined show choir or that he is attempting to get a record deal because he knows Stavros would not approve.

Several days later the group, dressed in hideous cowboy costumes, goes to perform at the club Nikko and his old band, Flux, had performed at in the beginning of the movie. There Nikko runs into his old band members, leading to an awkward confrontation and a lot of mockery from Flux. Meanwhile, Ta-da, who are also at the club, performs their song "Lonely Love Song". Nikko discovers from the other Spectacular! members that Royce is Courtney's ex-boyfriend. Upon witnessing Ta-da's good performance and the snobby attitudes of Tammi and Royce, Nikko becomes determined to help Spectacular! win the upcoming competition and begins to think that the group should come up with new dance moves and new music. One day, before Courtney arrives for choir practice, Nikko encourages the other choir members to try things a different way, and performs "Your Own Way", persuading the others to join in, Nikko sang the beginning of the song, and ask the others to show some talents, Tajid (Avan Jogia) started beatboxing, then other members Janet (Shannon Chan-Kent), Caspian (Joel Ballard) and Robin (Andrea Lewis) showcase their singing talent. Though they are initially reluctant to go against Courtney's wishes, the rest of the group eventually agree that they need a new routine in order to win the competition. They later meet up at Nikko's house, unbeknown to Courtney, and Nikko begins to teach them new dance moves, stating that if they perform the song in front of Courtney she would be impressed and may agree to change the group's style. The choir assembles at Nikko's house every night to practice while still attending practices with Courtney every afternoon.

Nikko learns of Spectacular!s tradition of gathering for a bowling night the week before a competition. Only four members, Nikko, Courtney, Caspian and Janet, show up at the bowling alley, where they discover that Tammi and Royce are already bowling in their lane. After a brief confrontation between the two groups, Nikko persuades the others to perform a song using "Rock The World," a spoof of the real-life video game Rock Band. Random selection chooses a song called "For the First Time", which was Courtney and Royce's old duet. She and Nikko sing it, much to Royce's jealousy, and Nikko and Courtney are becoming attracted to each other. Nikko invites Courtney over to his house for a surprise, and when they get there the whole group has assembled on Nikko's rooftop, where they all perform "Your Own Way" for Courtney. Courtney, instead of being impressed, is upset, accusing Nikko to have betrayed her by practicing another routine behind her back, and then leaves.

Later that night, Nikko goes to Courtney's house to apologize and almost has a fistfight with Royce, who has come to ask Courtney to get back together with him. Courtney rejects Royce, who tauntingly tells Nikko that Ta-Da will beat Spectacular! at the competition in the "weirdest trash talk that [Nikko's] ever heard." After Royce leaves, Nikko apologizes to Courtney for taking control of the group behind her back and offers to do things her way, but Courtney admits that the group needs a change. Courtney's mother tells Nikko that he can bring some good and change to the "Spectacular!" group and that Courtney will know how far they are actually able to push the envelope to win. The two of them decide to combine their talents and perform a song that everyone can agree upon, and Mr. Romano (Greg Germann), their music teacher, suggests a song called "Something to Believe In". Spectacular! begins intense rehearsals and all seems well ("Just Freak"), until Mr. Dickinson pays Nikko and Stavros a visit and informs them that his boss is offering Nikko and Flux a record deal after an audition and will only be available on Saturday night. Knowing that Spectacular! is scheduled to perform at the concert on Saturday night, Nikko is torn between his commitment to the choir and his one shot at getting a record deal. He tries to inform Courtney of his decision to audition for the record deal, but cannot bring himself to do it. Meanwhile, Amy informs Stavros that Nikko has joined choir and Stavros confronts Nikko in front of the members of Spectacular!, insisting that Niko drop out of choir and audition for the record deal instead. The other members of Spectacular! are upset at Nikko for bailing on them at the last minute, and Courtney feels that Nikko has betrayed her again.

Mr. Romano visits Nikko, who is having a tough time deciding what to do, at his house and reveals that he was once in a famous band as Joey Rome that could have been more successful if he hadn't flopped and broke his contract due to his fear of taking risks. Before leaving to go audition for the record deal, Courtney shows up. Nikko fears that she is mad at him for turning his back on "Spectacular!" but instead she kisses him on the cheek and wishes him luck. On concert night, Ta-Da performs "On The Wings Of A Dream" and earns much applause and acclaim from the audience. Meanwhile, Nikko and Flux perform at their audition for the record deal, but Nikko's heart is not in it and the producers notice and tell him they are not interested; Stavros says that Nikko is just warming up, and that he is better than what he is giving out. Nikko begs them to let him show where his "heart is." When it is Spectacular!s turn to sing "Something to Believe In" at the national competition, Nikko, much to Courtney's surprise and delight, arrives onstage right before the chorus, belting out a long note. Flux joins him, playing background music, and Mr. Romano reprises his dream as a rock star by playing a guitar during the song.  Nikko and Courtney reconcile, and the group earns a standing ovation.

Ta-Da is announced as the winner of the contest and Spectacular! is disqualified because Flux were unregistered members of the act. Tammi reveals to Royce that she had only used him to win the contest and breaks up with him. Even though Spectacular! lost the contest, Nikko's amazing performance got him the record deal. After everyone leaves, Nikko and Courtney share a kiss. It ends with Spectacular!, Flux, and Mr. Romano in a studio together recording a song, suitably named "Everything Can Change", with Nikko and Courtney as the lead singers in the song.

Cast
 Nolan Gerard Funk as Nikko Alexander, an ambitious singer who got kicked out of his band, Flux and later joined the show choir Spectacular!.
 Tammin Sursok as Courtney Lane, the ambitious leader of Spectacular!.
 Victoria Justice as Tammi, Royce's girlfriend, de facto leader, and the female lead singer of the show choir, Ta-da.
 Simon Curtis as Royce Du Lac, the male lead singer of the show choir, Ta-da and Tammi's boyfriend.
 Matthew Bennett as Rick Dickinson, a famous music producer.
 Greg Germann as Mr. Virgil Romano, Spectacular!'''s music teacher.
 Andrea Lewis as Robin, a Spectacular! member.
 Joel Ballard as Caspian, a Spectacular! member.
 Avan Jogia as Tajid, a Spectacular! member.
 Shannon Chan-Kent as Janet, Courtney's best friend, a Spectacular! member.
 Christopher Jacot as Stavros, Nikko's older brother.
 Britt Irvin as Amy, a Flux guitarist.
 Jesse Moss as Nils, a Flux guitarist.
 Harris Allan as Eric, the Flux drummer.
 Venus Terzo as Marion Lane, Courtney's mom.
 Kevin McNulty as Uncle Sam
 Troy Hatt as Swanee Boy
 Jean-Luc Bilodeau as Star-Spangled Boy
 Rukiya Bernard as Receptionist
 Anthony St. John as Anthony Gage
 David Quinlan as Emcee

Musical numbers
The order of the songs on the soundtrack, and the order of musical performances in the movie are minor changes. Rather than "Eye of the Tiger" and "Things We Do For Love" being the two final performances, like on the soundtrack, they are the second and third, respectively.

Soundtrack

On February 3, 2009, Nickelodeon released the Spectacular!'' soundtrack, featuring songs from the entire cast, including Nolan Gerard Funk and Tammin Sursok. The album, released by Nick Records, includes songs such as "Don't Tell Me" and "Everything Can Change".

DVD release
The DVD of the film was released on March 31, 2009, in the US, and on October 7, 2009, in Australia.

References

External links

 Official Soundtrack Website
 Official site
 Corus Kids May 2009 Highlights
 
 

2009 television films
2009 films
2000s musical comedy films
2009 romantic comedy films
2000s teen comedy films
American musical comedy films
American teen musical films
American teen comedy films
American romantic comedy films
American romantic musical films
Canadian musical comedy films
Canadian teen comedy films
Canadian romantic comedy films
Canadian comedy television films
2000s English-language films
Nickelodeon original films
Films shot in Vancouver
American teen romance films
Musical television films
American comedy television films
Films directed by Robert Iscove
Films scored by Michael Wandmacher
2000s American films
2000s Canadian films